Gagasi FM (previously P4 99.5 FM or P4 Radio Durban) is a radio station broadcasting in Durban and surrounding areas in KwaZulu Natal, South Africa, specialising in R&B, Afro pop, hip hop, house and kwaito.  it had a listenership of approximately 989,000. The station launched on 13 March 2006. It claims to be the only English and Zulu radio station in the country.

The station had 1 million listeners during its first year of operation.

Broadcast time
24/7

Listenership figures

References

External links
 Gagasi FM website 
 SAARF website
 Sentech website

Radio stations in Durban
Zulu-language mass media